The Islamic University College, Ghana is one of the private universities in Ghana. It is located at East Legon in the Greater Accra Region. It was established in 2000 by Dr.Abdolmajid Hakimollahi.  This was under the sponsorship of the Ahlul Bait Foundation of the Islamic Republic of Iran. It was granted accreditation provisionally in 2001 and finally in 2002.

Undergraduate programmes

BBA Accounting
BBA Banking and Finance
BBA Marketing
BBA Human Resource Management
BA Religious Studies (Islamic Studies)
BA Communication Studies (Journalism)
BA Communication Studies (Public Relations)
BA Communication Studies (Advertisement)
Bachelor of Education (Early Childhood Education)
Diploma in Education (Early Childhood Education)

Graduate programmes

MPhil Islamic Studies

Affiliations
University of Ghana, Legon
University of Education, Winneba (UEW)

References

Educational institutions established in 2000
Universities in Ghana
2000 establishments in Ghana
Ghana